Miltochrista pulchra is a moth of the family Erebidae. It was described by Arthur Gardiner Butler in 1877. It is found in the Russian Far East (Middle Amur, Primorye, Kunashir), China (Dunbei, Beijing, Shandong, Zhejiang, Fujiang, Shaanxi, Sichuan, Yunan), Korea and Japan.

References

 Arctiidae genus list at Butterflies and Moths of the World of the Natural History Museum

pulchra
Moths described in 1877
Moths of Asia